Žena za pultem (the woman behind the counter) was a Czechoslovak television programme which was first broadcast in 1977. The programme was directed by Jaroslav Dietl. The programme was noted for an erotic scene, which received attention from the ruling Communist Party of Czechoslovakia.

Cast
Jiřina Švorcová as  Anna Holubová (12 episodes, 1978)
Vladimír Menšík as  Karas (12 episodes, 1978)
Petr Haničinec as  Karel Broz (6 episodes, 1978)
Jana Boušková as  Micheala Holubová - Anna's daughter (5 episodes, 1978)
Hana Maciuchová as  Oli Škarapesová (5 episodes, 1978)
Josef Langmiler as Jiří Holub
Dana Medřická as Anna Mother
Jan Potměšil as Petr Holub (Anna's son)
Zdeněk Řehoř as Deputy Vilímek
Vladimír Hlavatý as warehouseman Dominik
Jaromír Hanzlík as warehouseman Oskar
Lenka Termerová as stutters Jiřinka from vegetables
Marie Motlová as gran Kubánková of handling bottles
Daniela Kolářová as cashier Soňa
Božena Böhmová as cashier Mlynářová
Karolina Slunéčková as saleswoman Zdena Klalášková
Simona Stašová as apprentice Zuzana
Kateřina Burianová as butcher Lada
Blažena Holišová as saleswoman from vegetables
Slávka Budínová as Vilímek wife
Soběslav Sejk as Karas friend
Josef Bláha as Anna's Neighbour
Růžena Merunková as Anna's Neighbour
Josef Somr as Kalášek
Alois Švehlík as taxi driver
Bedřich Prokoš as father of Karel Brož
Bohuš Záhorský
Věra Kubánková as Karas Wife
Petr Svojtka as Karas son
Jiřina Petrovická as Anna's daughter-in-law
Josef Vinklář as Anna's son-in-law
Alena Vránová as daughter (-)
Jiří Hrzán as Olina known
Eduard Cupák as Olina husband
Jiří Mikota
Ludmila Roubíková
Jiří Lábus
Otakar Brousek mladší
Darja Hajská
Ladislav Frej
Ema Skálová
Jaroslava Brousková
Eva Klepáčová
Stella Zázvorková
Vladimír Dvořák
Věra Budilová
Jindřich Hinke
Jana Břežková
Marta Kučírková
Růžena Lysenková
Jiřina Krejčíková
Eva Svobodová
František Hanus
Oldřich Vlach
Dana Syslová
Ladislav Křiváček
Jiří Bruder
Miroslav Homola
Zdeněk Ornest
Věra Tichánková
Pavla Maršálková
Mirko Musil
Martin Štěpánek
Vítězslav Černý
Ivo Niederle
Jaroslav Cmíral
Jan Cmíral

Story
The story is about Anna Holubová, her daughter Michala, her son Petr and her husbands. The whole story takes place under socialism (in the fifth episode appears 1 May and Gustáv Husák). Furthermore, in the example is mentioned  SSM (Socialist Union of Youth). Anna after the divorce starts working in a convenience store, where she meets her future husband while solving problems with stammering Jiřinka warehouse keeper Dominik, or Vilímek who likes her. But children do not like Anna's future husband (Peter Haničinec). Mother (Dana Medřická) again likes the way she moved (she works in the so-called OÚNZ - District Institute of National Health). Eventually, the children of Anna displease their father (Josef Langmiler), and permit Anna to get married again. The entire story takes place in one year (12 parts of 12 months).

Episodes
1.Anna nastupuje - Anna gets into work
2.Příběh zeleninové Jiřinky - The story of "Vegetable Jiřinka"
3.Příběh šéfova zástupce - The story of the deputy of the boss
4.Příběh řeznice Lady a skladníka Oskara - The story of the butcher Lada and the warehouseman Oscar
5.Příběh starého Dominika - The story of old Dominik
6.Vítězství prodavačky Kaláškové - The victory of shop assistant Kalášková
7.Příběh učednice Zuzany - The story of the apprentice Zuzana 
8.Příběh dvou pokladních - The story of two cashiers
9.Příběh důchodkyně Kubánkové - The story of the pensioner Kubánková
10.Příběh šéfova syna - The story of the boss' son
11.Svatba lahůdkové Olinky - The wedding of the "Deli Olinka"
12.Vánoce Anny Holubové - Anna Holubová's Christmas

References

External links 
 CSFD.cz - Žena za pultem
 

Czechoslovak television series
1977 Czechoslovak television series debuts
Czech drama television series
1970s Czechoslovak television series
Czechoslovak Television original programming